Sands of Time is the seventh studio album by Jay and the Americans released on March 15, 1969.  The album went to #51 on the Billboard 200 chart, reached #30 on the Cashbox chart, and #47 in Canada.
 
The song "This Magic Moment" hit #6 on the Billboard Hot 100, #1 in Canada, and was the group's first top ten hit in over three years. The song "Hushabye" hit #62 (#42 Canada), and "When You Dance" went to #70 in 1969 (#40 Canada). The album was conducted and arranged by Thomas Kaye. Following the release of the similarly-themed follow-up album Wax Museum in 1970, "Sands of Time" was reissued under the title Wax Museum, Vol. 2.

Track listing 
 "This Magic Moment" (Doc Pomus, Mort Shuman)
 "Pledging My Love" (Ferdinand Washington, Don Robey)
 "Can't We Be Sweethearts" (J. Herbert Cox, Morris Levy)
 "My Prayer" (Georges Boulanger, Jimmy Kennedy)
 "So Much in Love" (George Williams, Bill Jackson, Roy Straigis)
 "Since I Don't Have You" (Joseph Rock, James Beaumont)
 "Gypsy Woman" (Curtis Mayfield)
 "Hushabye" (Doc Pomus, Mort Shuman)
 "When You Dance" (Andrew Jones, Jr.)
 "Life Is But a Dream" (Raoul Cita, Hy Weiss, Sam Weiss)
 "Mean Woman Blues" (Claude Demetrius)
 "Goodnight My Love" (George Motola, John Marascalco)

Wax Museum vol. 2 

Following the release of the similarly-themed follow-up album Wax Museum in 1970, "Sands of Time" was reissued under the title Wax Museum, Vol. 2.. The album cover features a note saying formerly issued under the name of "sands of time"  . The LP featured the same track listing in the same order .

References 

1969 albums
Jay and the Americans albums
United Artists Records albums